Josef, Baron von Mering (28 February 1849, in Cologne – 5 January 1908, at Halle an der Saale, Germany) was a German physician.

Working at the University of Strasbourg, Mering was the first person to discover (in conjunction with Oskar Minkowski) that one of the pancreatic functions is the production of insulin, a hormone which controls blood sugar levels.

Mering was curious about the pancreas, a comma shaped organ, situated between the stomach and the small intestine. In an effort to discover its function, he removed the organ from a dog. The dog was then noticed frequently urinating on the floor, although it was house trained. Mering realised that this was a symptom of diabetes and tested the urine, which was found to be high in sugar, confirming his suspicion.

Josef von Mering helped to discover barbiturates, a class of sedative drugs used for insomnia, epilepsy, anxiety, and anesthesia. In 1903, he published observations that barbital (then known as diethyl-barbituric acid) has sedative properties in humans. In 1904, he helped to launch barbital under the brand name Veronal. Veronal was the first commercially available barbiturate sedative in any country. Von Mering collaborated with the chemist Emil Fischer, who was also involved in the discovery of barbital.

References

 Joseph von Mering at Encyclopædia Britannica

1849 births
1908 deaths
19th-century German physicians
Physicians from Cologne
People from the Rhine Province
University of Bonn alumni
University of Greifswald alumni
University of Strasbourg alumni
Academic staff of the University of Strasbourg
Academic staff of the Martin Luther University of Halle-Wittenberg